Harlan F. Stone was nominated and confirmed twice to the Supreme Court of the United States. First in 1925, when President Calvin Coolidge nominated him to serve as an associate justice and again in 1941, when President Franklin D. Roosevelt nominated Justice Stone to be elevated to Chief Justice. Both times, the United States Senate confirmed the nominations.

1925 nomination for associate justice
In 1925, President Calvin Coolidge successfully nominated Harlan F. Stone to serve as an associate justice of the Supreme Court of the United States, filling the vacancy left by Joseph McKenna's retirement.

Nomination by President Coolidge
Shortly after President Coolidge won reelection in the 1924 United States presidential election, Justice McKenna resigned from the Supreme Court. On January 5, 1925, Calvin Coolidge nominated Stone to replace McKenna as an Associate Justice. It does not appear that Coolidge considered any other candidates for the vacancy other than Stone. Stone himself had urged Coolidge to appoint Benjamin N. Cardozo.

Stone's nomination was greeted with general approval, although there were rumors that Stone might have been selected because of his antitrust activities. Some Senators raised concerns about Stone's connection to Wall Street making him a tool of corporate interests. He was widely regarded as having strong character, education, and temperament making him suited for the court.

Judiciary Committee reviews

First review
During their initial review of the nomination, the Senate Judiciary Committee held a single closed door hearing on January 12, 1925. In this hearing, they heard testimony from Willard Saulsbury Jr.. The Senate Judiciary Committee gave Stone's nomination a favorable recommendation on January 21, 1925.

Second review
Senator Burton K. Wheeler, a progressive member of the Democratic Party, and others raised objections to the nomination due to Stone's nomination. It was alleged that a federal grand jury indictment of Wheeler was politically motivated under Stone's preview as U.S. attorney general, and that Stone had taken questionable actions in relation to the investigation. The Senate had examined the charges against Wheeler, exonerating Wheeler in the judgement of a Senate inquiry. However, Stone did not withdraw the indictment. It was alleged that the motivations of the indictment was due to Wheeler's investigating of Stone's predecessor as attorney general, Harry Daugherty, for his failure to prosecute parties involved in the Teapot Dome scandal. A Senate investigation led by Wheeler had forced Daugherty to resign.

Other concerns raised related to Stone's Wall Street connections.

Based upon these concerns, on January 24, 1925, Wheeler-ally Senator Thomas J. Walsh persuaded the Senate to return the nomination to the Judiciary Committee for continued review. President Coolidge refused to withdraw his nomination of Stone. He agreed to a compromise that would see Stone provide an unprecedented testimony to the Judiciary Committee. No previous Supreme Court nominee had ever appeared before the Judiciary Committee.

To address concerns about his nomination, Stone proposed that he answer questions of the Senate Judiciary Committee in person. The nomination was returned by the Senate to committee on January 26, 1925. On January 28, Stone became the first Supreme Court nominee to testify before the Senate Judiciary Committee hearings on their nomination. The hearing was open to the public.  and Stone was questioned on his role related to the Teapot Dome scandal. Stone performed well in his five hours of testimony. On February 2, 1925, the committee again gave his nomination an favorable recommendation.

Confirmation vote
On February 25, 1925, the full Senate then voted 60–27 to consider the nomination. Stone was thereafter confirmed by the Senate by a vote of 71–6 and received his commission the same day.  On March 2, 1925, Stone took the oath as Associate Justice administered by Chief Justice William Howard Taft. He would prove to be Coolidge's only Supreme Court appointment.

1941 nomination for chief justice

In 1941, President Franklin D. Roosevelt successfully nominated Harlan F. Stone to be elevated from associate justice to chief justice, succeeding the retiring Charles Evans Hughes. Chief Hughes had started to consider retiring from the court in 1940, partially due to the declining health of his wife. In June 1941, Hughes informed Roosevelt of his impending retirement, and recommended that Roosevelt elevate Stone to be his successor as chief justice. Roosevelt accepted this suggestion. Stone's support for the New Deal had earned him favor from President Franklin D. Roosevelt. On June 12, 1941, President Roosevelt nominated Stone for chief justice,

After it held a single hearing on Stone's nomination on June 21, 1941, the Senate Judiciary Committee gave his nomination a favorable recommendation on June 23, 1941. Stone was confirmed by a voice vote in the Senate on June 27, 1941 and received his commission on July 3, 1941.

See also
 Calvin Coolidge Supreme Court candidates
 List of federal judges appointed by Calvin Coolidge
 Franklin D. Roosevelt Supreme Court candidates
 List of federal judges appointed by Franklin D. Roosevelt
 List of nominations to the Supreme Court of the United States

References

Nominations to the United States Supreme Court
United States federal judges appointed by Calvin Coolidge
United States federal judges appointed by Franklin D. Roosevelt